James O'Donnell Bennett (1870–1940) was an American journalist and author. He was best known for writing for the Chicago Tribune and the Chicago Record-Herald.

Biography 
James was born in Jackson, Michigan in 1870, and died in Chicago in 1940.

References

External links
 
 James O’Donnell Bennett papers at Newberry Library

1870 births
1940 deaths
Writers from Jackson, Mississippi
Journalists from Michigan
American male journalists
Journalists from Mississippi
People from Jackson, Michigan